Veshareh (also Romanized as Veshāreh and Beshāreh) is a village in the Dastjerd Rural District, Khalajastan District, Qom County, Qom Province, Iran. At the 2006 census, its population was 254, in 79 families.

Veshareh is one of the villages in Qom Province, near Dastjerd(Dastgerd) city and Karkas mountains. Its surrounding villages are: Mujan, Giv, Mansurabad, Sorkhdeh, Hemmatabad and Jowzeh.

History
Khajeh Nasir Toosi was born in Veshareh. There is a mountain in the village which is called Khaje Nasir mountain (Kooh-e Khajeh Nasir). Previously there was a castle on the mountain with the same name which has been destroyed completely.
The original name of the village was Varshah which in time is turned to Veshareh.

References 

Populated places in Qom Province